Flag House Courts was a public housing project built in 1955 in Baltimore, Maryland, comprising three 12-story buildings and multiple low-rise units. It had recreational facilities with bingo and dances, a swimming pool, and a basketball court. However, the complex had problems from its opening. Elevators often broke down, trapping riders for hours. Residents were forced to run fans, even in winter, because a faulty heating system made the buildings unbearably hot. There were also the problems of crime and drug dealing.  By the late 1960s, gunshots at the complex were common, and elevators and stairwells reeked of urine. Residents often threw objects out of windows, including Christmas trees. Vacant apartments were turned into drug hangouts, and stairwells became violent crime areas. 

In 1993, the projects were renovated slightly, but problems continued. They closed in 1998 and 1999 and were imploded in 2001.

In popular culture
In an episode of The Wire, Ellis Carver mentions growing up in the Flag House Projects.

References

Bibliography
Hayward, Mary Ellen and Charles Belfoure (2001). The Baltimore Rowhouse. Princeton: Princeton Architectural Press.
O'Donnell, John (1996). "City housing officials pick team to head Flag House Courts project; Complex will be leveled, replaced with 260 units." Baltimore Sun. June 3.
Valentine, Paul (1995). "2nd High-Rise to Go." Washington Post. December 4.

Buildings and structures in Baltimore
Jonestown, Baltimore
Public housing in Baltimore